Frogs is a single-player action arcade game released by Gremlin in 1978. It notably featured a jumping character (predating Donkey Kong by 3 years). The game's graphics are "projected" by laying the monitor flat on its back and reflecting the computer-generated graphics of the frogs and flies toward the player via a mirror at a 45-degree angle. (The game's graphics were actually generated and shown backward, so the mirror reflection would show letters and numbers properly.) The game was distributed by Sega in Japan.

Gameplay

The player controls a frog on lilypads and attempts to catch (with the frog's tongue and while jumping) various insects (butterflies and dragonflies) worth different numbers of points in a set amount of time.
The World Record holder is Marco Marocco with a score of 13.500.

Legacy
In 1980, Adventure International published a similar game with varying names–Frog, Frogs, Frog on a Log–for the TRS-80. In this version the player controls a large frog that moves left or right on a log.

Mattel released Frogs and Flies for the Atari 2600, which was renamed Frog Bog for the Intellivision version. Both were released in 1982.

References

External links
 Frogs at mamedb.com

1978 video games
Arcade video games
Arcade-only video games
Fictional frogs
Gremlin Industries games
Sega arcade games
Video games about amphibians
Video games about insects
Video games developed in the United States
Single-player video games